Louis King Johnson, Jr. (born December 27, 1987), better known by his stage name King Louie (or King L), is an American rapper from Chicago. Spin Magazine attributed King Louie as being one of the Chicago rappers who made Chicago the "hottest hip-hop" scene in 2012.

Early life 
King Louie was born Louis King Johnson Jr. in the Eastside of Chicago, Illinois on December 27, 1987. He attended Hyde Park Academy High School for a while before graduating from alternative school.

Career 
After attending high school, King Louie began building a following through one-on-one mixtapes. He would hand out CDs at bus stops and parties. King Louie released his debut mixtape entitled Boss Shit in September 2007, and the next year released his second mixtape Cloud 9 in December 2009.

However, his career was put on hold after he was hit by a car. He was hospitalized with both his legs broken with various other injuries and had to learn to walk again after his injuries were healed. He later returned to music, releasing a series of mixtapes that he made available online. Songs from his releases received regular air time, including his song "Too Cool" which was placed in regular rotation at WGCI-FM. To promote his mixtapes, King Louie launched a series of music videos on YouTube. His first video was for the song I'm Arrogant which was the lead track from his 2010 mixtape Man Up, Band Up. He released additional music videos and quickly grew a large following. It was his promotional methods on YouTube that helped him be one of the newer Chicago rappers to get noticed nationally.

In 2012, during a trip to Los Angeles, California, King Louie met and signed with Epic Records. While on his trip, Kanye West's record label GOOD Music released a remix of a song by Chicago hip-hop artist Chief Keef. During the release, West took  time to mention numerous other up and coming artists, including King L. King Louie was later quoted on MTV's Sucker Free program that he was shocked and not aware that West was a fan. He would later appear on West's Yeezus, performing a verse and the hook on the track "Send It Up". He was shot in the head in Chicago on December 23, 2015, and survived the shooting.

Discography 

 Boss Shit (2007)
 Cloud 9 (2008)
 Man Up Band Up (2010)
 More Boss Shit (2011)
 Chiraq Drillinois (2011)
 Hardbody The Mixtape with Bo$$ Who & Sno Boy (2011)
 #ManUpBandUp Pt.1 (2011)
 Man Up Band Up 2 (2011)
 The Motion Picture (2012)
 Showtime (2012)
 Drilluminati (2012)
 March Madness (2013)
 Jeep Music (2013)
 Drilluminati 2 (2013)
 Soprano (2014)
 Tony (2014)
 Drilluminati 3: God of Drill (2015)
 6 God Tony (2015)
 Play Dat Again (2015)
 Featuring Tony (2016)
 Tony 2 (2016)
 Life With Louie (2022)

Guest appearances

See also 

 List of Epic Records artists

References

External links 
 

Living people
1987 births
African-American male rappers
Drill musicians
Gangsta rappers
Epic Records artists
Midwest hip hop musicians
Rappers from Chicago
Songwriters from Illinois
21st-century American rappers
21st-century American male musicians
African-American songwriters
21st-century African-American musicians
20th-century African-American people
American male songwriters